Dolf Sternberger (originally Adolf Sternberger; 28 July 1907 in Wiesbaden – 27 July 1989 in Frankfurt/Main) was a German philosopher and political scientist at the University of Heidelberg. Dolf Sternberger is known for his concept of citizenship in contemporary German political thought, and for coining the term "constitutional patriotism" (Verfassungspatriotismus) in 1979, on the occasion of the 30th anniversary of the Federal Republic of Germany.

Notes

References
 Bernhard Vogel: Dolf Sternberger und die Politische Wissenschaft. Heidelberg 2008.

External links 
 
 "Sprachkritik", Nazism, and the German Conscience: the Career of Dolf Sternberger
 Dolf-Sternberger-Gesellschaft e.V.

20th-century German philosophers
1907 births
1989 deaths
German political scientists
Grand Crosses 1st class of the Order of Merit of the Federal Republic of Germany
Academic staff of Heidelberg University
German male writers
Hessischer Rundfunk people
Frankfurter Allgemeine Zeitung people
German magazine founders
20th-century political scientists